Parliamentary elections were held in Finland on 1 and 2 July 1927. Although the Social Democratic Party remained the largest in Parliament with 60 of the 200 seats, Juho Sunila of the Agrarian League formed an Agrarian minority government in December 1927. It remained intact until December 1928. Voter turnout was 55.8%.

Background
Finland was governed during the 1927 election by a Social Democratic minority government led by Väinö Tanner. President Lauri Kristian Relander, an Agrarian, had supported the establishment of that minority government, after the Agrarian Prime Minister Kyösti Kallio's first government had been defeated in a vote of confidence in November 1926. He had advised Tanner to prepare a liberal and moderate government programme, which the Agrarians and Progressives could support. In April 1927 President Relander caught a cold which developed into a life-threatening pneumonia.  He had to go on sick leave, and Tanner became the Acting President. He even received the centre-right Civil Guards' (Suojeluskunnat in Finnish;  a voluntary Finnish men's paramilitary defence organization) salute on the Defence Forces' Flag Day (then held on 16 May).  The bourgeois (non-socialist) parties tried to get back into power by persuading enough Finnish voters to reject the Social Democratic minority government.

Results

References

General elections in Finland
Finland
Parliament
Finland
Election and referendum articles with incomplete results